Stepan Filippovich Galaktionov (6 July 1779, Saint Petersburg4 December 1854, Saint Petersburg) was a Russian lithographer, graphic artist, and cityscape  painter.

Biography 
In 1785, he was admitted to the Imperial Academy of Arts which, at that time, had an elementary school. His teachers included Ignaz Sebastian Klauber, Mikhail Matveevich Ivanov, and Semyon Shchedrin.

He graduated in 1800 with a Certificate of the First Degree. In 1806, he was named an honorary Academician. He later became a full Academician for landscape painting, based on his depiction of the lapidary factory in Peterhof. He was a teacher at the Academy from 1817 until his death. In the 1820s, he was one of the first Russian artists to master lithography.

In 1830, he was promoted to Advisor for landscape engraving. The following year, when that title was abolished, he was designated a Professor, Third Degree. In 1850, he was named an Honored Professor. In addition, he was in the service of the hydrographic depot at Naval Headquarters, where he taught the drawing of marine animals, as well as engraving and lithography.

In addition to teaching, he created vignettes for several almanacs and magazines, and provided illustrations for the works of many contemporary authors, such as Ivan Krylov and Alexander Pushkin. As was common practice at the time, most of his engravings were based on other artists' paintings and drawings, but he also created original works.

He was married to the daughter of a wealthy archpriest in Smolensk. They had three daughters, one of whom (Anna), married the medallist, .

Sources 

 
 Biography from the Russian Biographical Dictionary @ Russian Wikisource
 
 Mikhail Babenchikov, Русская гравюра. С.Ф. Галактионов, Moscow, 1951 (Ozon)

External links

 Biography and works @ Ваш День Рождения
 Brief biography from the Great Soviet Encyclopedia @ Gufo
 Brief biography @ Art11 Gallery

1779 births
1854 deaths
Russian landscape painters
Russian engravers
Imperial Academy of Arts alumni
Russian illustrators
Artists from Saint Petersburg